Munshi is a Persian word, originally used for a contractor, writer, or secretary, and later used in the Mughal Empire in India for native language teachers, teachers of various subjects, especially administrative principles, religious texts, science, and philosophy and were also secretaries and translators employed by Europeans.

Etymology
Munshi is a Persian word derived form Arabic, that is used as a respected title for persons who achieved mastery over languages, especially in the Indian subcontinent. It became a surname to those people whose ancestors had received this title and some of whom also served as ministers and administrators in the kingdoms of various Royals and are regarded as nobility. In modern Persian, this word is also used to address administrators, head of departments.

Use by British
Administrators, head of departments, accountants, and secretaries hired by the government in India were known as Munshies. The family name Munshi was adopted by families whose ancestors were honoured with this title and were responsible for administering various offices etc. and these families (selective) were and are regarded as nobility. Abdul Karim, known as "The Munshi", was a highly valued and respected Indian attendant of Queen Victoria.

Kashmiri surname
Munshi is used as a last name by Kashmiri Pandits native to the Kashmir Valley of Jammu and Kashmir, India. It was a title gifted to the Kashmiri Pandits for their mastery over the Persian language.

See also
Abdullah bin Abdul Kadir
Kanhaiyalal Maneklal Munshi
Munshi Abdur Rouf
Munshi Hakimuddin
Munshi Premchand
Mohan Lal Kashmiri

References

External links

Bengali words and phrases
Government of British India
Government of the Mughal Empire
Historians from the Mughal Empire
Indian surnames
Hindu surnames
Kashmiri tribes
Kashmiri-language surnames
Urdu-language words and phrases
Titles in Bangladesh